Luttwak or Lutwak is a Jewish surname. Notable persons with that name include:

 Edward Luttwak (born 1942), American military strategist and historian
 Erwin Lutwak (born 1946), American mathematician
 Leo Lutwak (1928–2006), American nutritionist, endocrinologist, and biochemist
 Steven Lutvak, Musician, songwriter and lyricist

Jewish surnames